Ulmus 'Rebella' is an American hybrid cultivar elm raised from a rare crossing of the Chinese Elm U. parvifolia (female parent) and the American Elm U. americana by Smalley and Guries of the Wisconsin Alumni Research Foundation in 1987 as clone 2245-9. Grown under licence by Eisele GmbH, Darmstadt, Germany, 'Rebella' was released to commerce in Europe in 2011.

Description
'Rebella' is a small, slow growing tree with pendent twigs bearing small leaves which can turn brown, red, orange, or yellow in autumn, depending on the weather.

Pests and diseases
'Rebella' is very resistant to Dutch elm disease.

Cultivation
'Rebella' is intended as a garden ornamental;.  It is not known to be in commerce in North America or Australasia.

Accessions

Europe
Grange Farm Arboretum , Sutton St James, Spalding, Lincs., UK. Acc. no. 1093.
Wijdemeren City Council, Wijdemeren, Netherlands, Elm arboretum. 1 planted in cemetery The Hornhof, Slotlaan, Nederhorst den Berg 2015. 10 planted Pieter de Hooghlaan 2019, 3 planted roundabout Oud-Loosdrechtsedijk, Loosdrecht 2019

Nurseries

Europe
Eisele GmbH, Darmstadt, Germany.
Future Forests , Kealkill, Bantry, County Cork, Ireland.
Hilliers Nurseries , Winchester, UK.
Noordplant kwekerijen , Glimmen, Netherlands.

References

Hybrid elm cultivar
Ulmus articles with images
Ulmus